DPR may refer to:

Government
Democratic People's Republic of Korea, DPR of Korea
Donetsk People's Republic, a self-proclaimed statelet in eastern Ukraine
California Department of Pesticide Regulation, US
Democratic Party of Russia
House of Representatives of Indonesia, the lower house of the Indonesian legislature.
United States District Court for the District of Puerto Rico, cited as DPR
Data Protection Registrar, the former name of the UK's Information Commissioner

Other
David Price Racing, motor racing team
Dermatopathia pigmentosa reticularis, a congenital disorder
DPR (Dread Pirate Roberts), a pseudonym of Ross Ulbricht who ran darknet site Silk Road 
DPR Construction, an American general contractor 
DPR Live, a South Korean singer
Dream Perfect Regime (DPR), is a multi genre music and video group. Based in Seoul, the collective's main focus is to engage all the audiences by actualizing a distinctive audiovisual experience.
 Device Pixel Ratio - measure of the pixel density of an electronic device